Mathews County Courthouse Square is a national historic district located at Mathews, Mathews County, Virginia. It encompasses seven contributing buildings, one contributing site, two contributing structures, and 2 contributing objects on Courthouse Square. The courthouse is a T-shaped, Federal style brick building constructed in 1792–1795.  Associated with the courthouse are the clerks office (1859), the former jail and later sheriffs office, "Old Jail," and Mathews County Library (1930).  Several monuments occupy the square, notably the Confederate monument, the 1928 Fort Cricket Hill monument, and a World War I cannon.

It was listed on the National Register of Historic Places in 1977.

References

Courthouses on the National Register of Historic Places in Virginia
County courthouses in Virginia
Historic districts on the National Register of Historic Places in Virginia
Federal architecture in Virginia
Government buildings completed in 1795
Buildings and structures in Mathews County, Virginia
National Register of Historic Places in Mathews County, Virginia